Baby Doll Pizza is a pizzeria in Portland, Oregon.

Description

Baby Doll Pizza is a New York-style pizzeria on Stark Street in the southeast Portland portion of the Kerns neighborhood, named after a topless bar in Manhattan. In 2018, Nick Woo of Eater Portland wrote, "In this laid-back, casual spot with pinball machines and checkerboard flooring, pizza is available by the slice or as a whole pie. The thin crust has a crispy bottom, and toppings are made in-house including the sauce, sausage, ricotta, and mozzarella. Adjoining a full bar, the draft list runs about 12 deep with about 30 bottle choices. It’s also open late to satisfy any 2 a.m. pizza cravings." In 2021, the website's Rachel Pinsky said, "Enthusiastic twenty-somethings in overalls and tie dye serve pepperoni pies, sandwiches, and squares from this popular pizza spot frequented by Central Catholic students and SE Stark neighbors", and Nathan Williams wrote, "This is comfort food pizza intended to accompany the deep tap list of Baby Doll’s adjoining bar. Chessboard floor tile, pinball machines, black leather booths, and low-hung lighting gives the dining room David Lynch meets Tim Burton vibes."

History

The pizzeria was founded by Travis Miranda in 2012. Baby Doll filled the space previously occupied by Stark Naked Pizza. Adam Milne purchased the business in 2021.

Baby Doll has offered special pies for the annual Pizza Week. In 2016, The Gavone had basil, mozzarella, provolone, vodka sauce, breaded deep-fried chicken, and penne pasta. 2019's Over Acheeser had mozzarella, gouda provolone mushrooms, roasted red peppers, garlic, rosemary, and organic tomato sauce. In 2021, the pizzeria's Holy Mole included mozzarella and pepper jack, mole-marinated chicken, sautéed poblano pepper, white onion, avocado cilantro crema, and cotija cheese.

The restaurant offers in-house delivery, as of 2021.

Reception
In 2017, Willamette Week included the restaurant in a list of the city's best bar pizzas. Michael Russell ranked Baby Doll number three in The Oregonian 2018 list of Portland's best pizza by the slice. Considered a local favorite, the business had 4.5 out of 5 stars on Yelp, based on 364 reviews, as of February 2020.

See also

 Pizza in Portland, Oregon

References

External links

 
 Baby Doll Pizza at Zomato

2012 establishments in Oregon
Kerns, Portland, Oregon
Pizzerias in Portland, Oregon
Restaurants established in 2012
Southeast Portland, Oregon